Betley Road was a station on the London and North Western Railway serving Betley, Staffordshire.

It opened in 1875 and closed in 1945.

References

Further reading

Disused railway stations in Cheshire
Former London and North Western Railway stations
Railway stations in Great Britain opened in 1875
Railway stations in Great Britain closed in 1945
1875 establishments in England
1945 disestablishments in England